Jens Schöngarth (born 7 December 1988) is a German handball player for Sporting CP and the German national team.

References

External link

1988 births
Living people
People from Emmendingen
Sportspeople from Freiburg (region)
German male handball players
Sporting CP handball players